

Haruo Aoki 

Haruo Aoki was a Linguist that was born in Kunsan, Japan(South Korea). Akoi was a professor Emeritus of East Asian Languages and Cultures. He is known for his work with the Nez Perce or otherwise known as Niimíipuu. He also did lot of linguists work for within the Nagasaki dialect of Japanese. Coupled along with all his linguist work he was still able to create a family and life in the San Francisco area of California where he resided util his death.

Early life 
Haruo Aoki was born April 1, 1930, in Kunsan, Japan, during the time in which Japan was occupying Korea. He was the first born to Yae Aoki and Yamada "Akira" Aoki, who had two other children, Kazuko and Yoshi. Aoki spent his childhood going to school, until his 6th grade year, in april of 1942 when his education turned into military training, due to the State General Mobilization Law During this time Aoki was taught classes in english, and studied in his make shift sleeping quarters. In early 1945 Haruo passed the navy examination and left for japan 1 month after his fifteenth birthday, and arrived in June 30, 1945 and only a few months later World War II ended. Haruo a still 15 year old boy is left to travel without any knowledge of Japan's countryside to his grandparents home in the Nagasaki Prefecture, to live with his Fathers Parents. While his parents and siblings travel from now very fragile country of South Korea, reuniting with their son in December 1945. Aoki after the Demilitarisation soon returned to school and finished high school in 1946. After graduation Hauro took an exam to complete a bachelors at Hiroshima University and passed in 1948.

University and Professional Life 
Haruo Aoki attended Hiroshima University, the University of Literature and Science from 1949 to 1953 He finished the entirety of his bachelors degree, and graduated with a degree in English in March 1953. After his completion of his undergraduate degree Haruo was granted the A Fulbright Scholorship to continue his higher education studies in the United States. Aoki came into the united states with a one year visa and attended the University of California, Los Angeles(UCLA), to study English. The one year quickly turned into a lifetime. While study at UCLA Haruo met his future wife Mary Ann, while working on his masters degree. After the completion of his Maters in English in 1958, He proposed to Mary Ann and moved to Berkley. Soon after the move he and Mary Ann married and Haruo stated his Doctoral Degree at the University of California, Berkeley in linguistics. This is when he was offered a chance to study the Nez Perce, and he agreed, and prepared for the Nez Perce Reservation, in Idaho. Hauro spent lot of time within Idaho and advent regions studying and learning the Nez Perce Language and in 1965 he finished and defend his dissertation on Nez Perce Grammar. After this he was given a position as a professor of East Asian Languages and Cultures. During the time in which he was able to accomplish a lot of his published work such as Nez Perce Texts(1979), Nez perce Oral Narratives(1989), a majority of the work on the Nez Perce Dictionary(1994) and a few others. During this time he made deep relationships with the people whom he was learning from and a great amount respect for allowing the Nez Perce people to connect to the language of their ancestors. Haruo was also doing linguistic work within the Nagasaki dialect of Japanese, beings that he was so entranced by the differences whist living with his grandparents. In the 1990's Hauro retired from professing, became a professor of Emeritus if east Asian Language and Culture and subsequently finished The Nez Perce dictionary. Throughout his retirement he was given many gifts from the Indigenous peoples, as they were very thankful for all the work he did. Haruo was very courteous whilst receiving the gift and kindly thanked them for thinking of him. Haruo lived out the rest of his life in the San Francisco area with his children, until he passed away in February 2022 at the age of 91.

References